UnFreedom Day is an unofficial annual event that is marked every year on or around 27 April. UnFreedom Day is planned to coincide with the official South African holiday called Freedom Day, an annual celebration of South Africa's first non-racial democratic elections of 1994.

UnFreedom Day was started by Abahlali baseMjondolo in Durban in 2005 has become a day of education in which films, discussions and performances play a major role.  The theme of the day is to demonstrate that the poor are still not free in South Africa.  Abahlali use the day to celebrate the growing strength of the movement's struggle.

Abahlali baseMjondolo now also marks the day in Cape Town and other communities and social movements such as some Anti-Eviction Campaign communities have participated in UnFreedom Day with Abahlali baseMjondolo and have also begun marking UnFreedom Day in their own communities. In 2017 it was reported to have been attended by thousands.

In 2018 Abahlali baseMjondolo used the event to announce that the count of its audited membership had exceeded 50 000.

Repression

In 2009 the South African police initially tried to ban the UnFreedom Day event held by Abahlali baseMjondolo, together with the Anti-Eviction Campaign, the Landless People's Movement, the Rural Network and the eMacambini Anti-Removal Committee (all of these movements supported the No Land! No House! No Vote! campaign) in the Kennedy Road settlement in Durban. However the police ban was seen off, those who had been arrested were released and the event went ahead with a police helicopter circling low above the assembly. A number of popular musical groups performed at the event including the Dlamini King Brothers.

References

External links
Dear Mandela: A film about unfreedom, by Jared Sacks, Mail & Guardian, 2012
ENCA Television news report on UnFreedom Day, 2013

April observances
Society of South Africa
Unofficial observances
Politics of South Africa
Housing in South Africa
Housing protests